Give Me Your Hand is a 2008 French-German drama film directed by Pascal-Alex Vincent. The soundtrack was composed by electronic/post rock band Tarwater.

Plot
The film opens with a scene rendered through hand-drawn Japanese-style animation in which eighteen-year-old identical twin brothers, Antoine and Quentin, flee from their father's bakery and dodge a train on their way out of their native village in France. The medium then shifts to a live-action film as they commence a journey to attend the funeral of their mother, whom neither has ever met, in Spain. While the brothers make arrangements to hitchhike with the owner of a Volkswagen, gas-station attendant Clémentine quits her job on a whim and jumps into the back of the vehicle, where she has sex with Quentin on a mattress in the back of the van. Antoine jealous, initiates a fistfight with his brother, and then has sex with the girl himself when they camp for the night. The girl abruptly leaves in the morning.

Travel continues, with Quentin whining and complaining, he asks if they could take a train. The brothers soon after stop at a farm for a few days to earn money for train tickets. While collecting hay bales in the fields, Quentin is befriended by another young laborer named Hakim, who offers him pot and initiates a clandestine sexual relationship. Antoine observes the tryst in the dark, and the following morning silently insists that he and his brother leave even though they are still short of the money needed to buy their tickets. At a restaurant outside the train station, Antoine sees a man cruising for sex, and when Quentin goes to the bathroom, Antoine pimps his brother for one hundred Euros. The john corners Quentin and tries unsuccessfully to penetrate him before he escapes. Unable to locate his brother, Antoine boards the train alone. When he awakes, he vaguely laments his contentious relationship with his brother to a stranger sitting across from him, who responds that she adored her imaginary sister as a child, but ends by remarking that their tranquility was possible only because the sister was make believe.

Resuming his cross-country odyssey alone, Antoine crosses a thickly-wooded vale and briefly glimpses what he thinks is his brother, but racing down a hill falls and cracks his head against a stone. A middle-aged woman finds him with bugs crawling over his face and brings him to her remote cottage, where she violently bathes him and later performs a brusque handjob on him as he sleeps. Antoine absconds in the morning and gets picked up by a Spaniard and his diabetic father. When Antoine finally arrives at his destination, he sees Quentin, approaches him silently from behind, and gingerly presses his fingers into his brother's hand. After the funeral, Quentin tells Antoine that their father is expecting them home, and the two run across the beach into the ocean, where they brutally brawl in the waves. Quentin knocks Antoine unconscious and pulls his limp body back onto the shore. Antoine suddenly awakes and vomits. First sobbing with relief and then becoming stoical, Quentin stands, turns his back on his brother, and retreats towards the sunset.

Cast 
 Alexandre Carril – Antoine
 Victor Carril – Quentin
 Anaïs Demoustier – Clémentine
 Samir Harrag – Hakim
 Fernando Ramallo – Angel

Production
In the early 2000s, director Pascal-Alex Vincent heard a report of adolescent twins in the aristocratic French neighborhood of Marais with a penchant for street brawling. Vincent first cast them in a short film called Bébé Requin, which competed at Cannes in 2005, and later built the screenplay for Give Me Your Hand around their real-life druthers for violent wrestling.

Critical response 
On review-aggregating site Rotten Tomatoes, the film holds a rating of 40% based on 10 reviews, with an average rating of 4.9/10. On Metacritic, the film has a score of 50 out of 100 based on 5 reviews, indicating "mixed or average reviews". Mike Hale of the New York Times compared the film unfavorably to the picaresque road trip film Going Places, and lamented that the motives behind the brothers' resentment and violence never gets explained. Writing for The Guardian, Peter Bradshaw noted that while the actors "have moody, high-cheekboned presence", there is nevertheless "something preposterous about the leads and their smouldering emotions".

References

External links 

2000s drama road movies
French drama road movies
Films about twin brothers
French LGBT-related films
German LGBT-related films
German drama road movies
2008 LGBT-related films
2008 films
2008 directorial debut films
Films directed by Pascal-Alex Vincent
Gay-related films
2008 drama films
2000s French films
2000s German films